Supernatural is the seventh full-length studio album by American country rap artist Ryan Upchurch. It was released on August 19, 2018 via Redneck Nation Records. It was recorded in Nashville, Tennessee and produced by Thomas "Greenway" Toner a.k.a. T-Stoner. The album features guest appearances from Rizzi Myers, Big Murph, Carly Rogers, Struggle Jennings and Trace Cyrus.

The album debuted at number 71 on the Billboard 200 albums chart in the United States. It peaked at No. 6 on the Top Country Albums chart and No. 40 on the Top R&B/Hip-Hop Albums chart.

Track listing

Charts

References

External links
Supernatural by Upchurch on iTunes
Upchurch© Super Natural album on Redneck Nation

2018 albums
Upchurch (musician) albums